Navlakh Umbre is a village and gram panchayat in Mawal taluka, Pune district, Maharashtra, India. It is located about 100 km from Mumbai in the Western Ghats. The nearest railway station is Talegaon on the Pune-Mumbai route.

Administration
The village is administrated by a sarpanch, an elected representative who leads a gram panchayat. At the time of the 2011 Census of India, the village was the headquarters for the eponymous gram panchayat, which also governed the villages of Badhalawadi, Jadhavwadi and Mendhewadi.

Demographics
At the 2011 census, the village comprised 594 households. The population of 3064 was split between 1617 males and 1447 females.

See also
Villages in Mawal taluka

References

Villages in Mawal taluka
Gram Panchayats in Pune district